The 2016 Mubadala World Tennis Championship was a non-ATP affiliated exhibition tournament. It was the 9th edition of the Mubadala World Tennis Championship with the world's top players competing in the event, held in a knockout format. The prize money for the winner was $250,000. The event was held at the Abu Dhabi International Tennis Complex at the Zayed Sports City in Abu Dhabi, United Arab Emirates.

Andy Murray (world number 1) and Milos Raonic (number 3) received byes to the semi-final.

Champion

  
  Rafael Nadal def.  David Goffin, 6–4, 7–6(7–5)

Players

References

External links
Official website

World Tennis Championship
2016 in Emirati tennis
World Tennis Championship
December 2016 sports events in Asia